John Durham Peters (born 1958) is the María Rosa Menocal Professor of English and of Film & Media Studies at Yale University. A media historian and social theorist, he has authored a number of noted scholarly works. His first book, Speaking into the Air: A History of the Idea of Communication, traces out broad historical, philosophical, religious, cultural, legal, and technological contexts for the study of communication. His second book Courting the Abyss: Free Speech and the Liberal Tradition updates the philosophy of free expression with a history of liberal thought since Paul of Tarsus. His most recent book The Marvelous Clouds: Toward a Philosophy of Elemental Media radically rethinks how media are environments and environments are also media. He has held fellowships with the National Endowment for the Humanities, the Fulbright Foundation, and the Leverhulme Trust.

Peters grew up in Brookline, Massachusetts, pursued studies at Brigham Young University in Provo, Utah, and graduated with a B.A. in English from the University of Utah, where he also earned his M.A. in Speech Communication. He received a Ph.D. in Communication Theory and Research from Stanford University in 1986 before accepting a faculty appointment at the University of Iowa. After teaching there for thirty years, he accepted a position at Yale University in 2017.

"Dialogue and dissemination" 
In chapter one of Speaking Into the Air, Peters (1999) compares two forms of communication: dialogue and dissemination. Even though dialogue tends to be viewed as the better means of communications, Peters believes that it can be cruel and destructive. Dissemination is fair because, unlike dialogue, it does not force listeners to understand and reciprocate to the speaker. The lack of interaction provided by dissemination leaves the audience free to interpret meanings themselves. Peters explains that communication can be achieved even if it is one way.

Selected works
 Promiscious Knowledge: Information, Image, and Other Truth Games in History" (2021) coauthored with Kenneth Cmiel
"The Marvelous Clouds: Toward a Philosophy of Elemental Media (2015)
 Courting the Abyss: Free Speech and the Liberal Tradition (2005)
 Canonic Texts in Media Research: Are There Any? Should There Be? How About These? With co-editors Elihu Katz, Tamar Liebes, and Avril Orloff (2003)
 Mass Communication and American Social Thought: Key Texts, 1919-1968. With Peter Simonson (2004).
 Speaking into the Air: A History of the Idea of Communication (1999) - Excerpt about the Dead Letters Office
 “‘The Marketplace of Ideas’: A History of the Concept.” Toward a Political Economy of Culture: Capitalism and Communication in the Twenty-First Century. Eds. Andrew Calabrese and Colin Sparks. Boulder: Rowman and Littlefield, 2004. 65-82.
 “Space, Time, and Communication Theory.” Canadian Journal of Communication 28 (2003): 397-411.
 “Witnessing.” Media, Culture and Society, 23.6 (2001): 707-724.
 “Public Journalism and Democratic Theory: Four Challenges.” The Idea of Public Journalism. Ed. Theodore L. Glasser. New York: Guilford Press, 1999. 99-117.
 “Distrust of Representation: Habermas on the Public Sphere.” Media, Culture and Society 14.3 (1993): 441-471.
 “Institutional Sources of Intellectual Poverty in Communication Research.” Communication Research 13.4 (1986): 527-59.

References

External links
 Personal work site, including publications
 University of Iowa faculty page
 Comments on liberalism

1958 births
Living people
People from Brookline, Massachusetts
Media historians
American Latter Day Saints
Brigham Young University alumni
University of Iowa faculty
University of Utah alumni
Stanford University alumni